Bald Mountain may refer to:

Geographic locations in the United States

 Bald Mountain (Heceta Island), Alaska
 Bald Mountain (California), a name given to over fifty summits in California
 Bald Mountain (Humboldt County)
 , a peak near Little Grass Valley Reservoir in California
 Bald Mountain (Summit County, Colorado)
 Bald Mountain (Murray County, Georgia)
 Bald Mountain (Idaho)
 Bald Mountain (Dedham, Maine), site of a plane crash in Dedham, Maine
 Bald Mountain (Michigan)
 Bald Mountain Recreation Area, Oakland County, Michigan
 Bald Mountain, Jefferson County, Montana
 Bald Mountain, Madison County, Montana
 Bald Mountain, Mineral County, Montana
 Bald Mountain, Park County, Montana
 Bald Mountain (Lincoln County, Nevada), a mountain peak of Nevada
 Bald Mountain (Lyon County, Nevada)
 Bald Mountain (New Jersey)
 Bald Mountain (Greene County, New York)
 Bald Mountain (Herkimer County, New York)
 Bald Mountain (Lewis County, New York)
 Bald Mountain (Sullivan County, New York)
 Bald Mountain (Schoharie County, New York)
 Bald Mountain Brook, a river in Herkimer County, New York
 Bald Mountain (Oregon), in the Cascade Range
 Bald Mountain (Pennsylvania)
 Bald Mountain (Uinta Range), Utah
 Bald Mountain, Bennington, Vermont
 Bald Mountain (Washington), a name given to about 15 summits in Washington
 Bald Mountain, a peak of the White Rock ridgeline of New York, Vermont, and Massachusetts
 Bald Mountains, a subrange of the Appalachian Mountains spanning the Tennessee-North Carolina border
 Central Nevada Bald Mountain, a biome of the Central Basin and Range ecoregion

Other uses
 Bald Mountain (folklore), a location where, in Slavic folklore, witches gather for their Sabbath
 Bald Mountain mine, a gold mine in Nevada, US
 Bald Mountain Ski Area, Idaho, US
 Bald Mountain, a location in the 1940 Walt Disney animated film Fantasia

See also
The Bald Mountain meteorite of 1929
Mount Pelée (translated as "Bald Mountain"), a volcano in Martinique
Lysá hora (translated as "Bald Mountain"), a mountain in the Czech Republic
Night on Bald Mountain, compositions by Modest Mussorgsky and Nikolay Rimsky-Korsakov
Monte Baldo, a mountain range in the Italian Alps